Ridsdalea is an Asian genus of plants in the family Rubiaceae; it was named after Dr. Colin Ernest Ridsdale (1944–2017), who was an English botanist and Specialist in tropical plants and Rubiaceae family. The type species is Ridsdalea grandis (Korth.) J.T.Pereira, which was renamed from the basionym Gardenia grandis. Several other species have been reassigned from other genera: notably Rothmannia, which is now reserved for African species.   Its native range is southern China, Indo-China, Malesia and New Guinea.

Species 
As accepted by Plants of the World Online, and IPNI list:
 Ridsdalea alba K.Khamm.
 Ridsdalea anisophylloides (Wernham) J.T.Pereira
 Ridsdalea attopevensis (Pit.) J.T.Pereira
 Ridsdalea daweishanensis (Y.M.Shui & W.H.Chen) J.T.Pereira
 Ridsdalea eucodon (K.Schum.) J.T.Pereira
 Ridsdalea forsteniana (Miq.) J.T.Pereira
 Ridsdalea graciliflora (Merr.) J.T.Pereira
 Ridsdalea grandis (Korth.) J.T.Pereira
 Ridsdalea kampucheana (Tirveng.) J.T.Pereira
 Ridsdalea kassamensis J.T.Pereira
 Ridsdalea lagunensis (Merr.) J.T.Pereira
 Ridsdalea leytensis (J.T.Pereira & Ridsdale) J.T.Pereira
 Ridsdalea macromera (Lauterb. & K.Schum.) J.T.Pereira
 Ridsdalea merrillii (Elmer) J.T.Pereira
 Ridsdalea negrosensis (Merr.) J.T.Pereira
 Ridsdalea nigrescens (Valeton) J.T.Pereira
 Ridsdalea papuana J.T.Pereira
 Ridsdalea pseudoternifolia (Valeton) J.T.Pereira
 Ridsdalea puffiana J.T.Pereira
 Ridsdalea pulcherrima (Kurz) J.T.Pereira
 Ridsdalea schoemannii (Teijsm. & Binn.) J.T.Pereira
 Ridsdalea sootepensis (Craib) J.T.Pereira
 Ridsdalea sundaensis J.T.Pereira
 Ridsdalea thailandica (Tirveng.) J.T.Pereira
 Ridsdalea uranthera (C.E.C.Fisch.) K.M.Wong
 Ridsdalea uvarioides (Valeton) J.T.Pereira
 Ridsdalea venalis (Bremek.) J.T.Pereira
 Ridsdalea vidalii (Bremek.) J.T.Pereira
 Ridsdalea vietnamensis (Tirveng.) J.T.Pereira
 Ridsdalea wittii (Craib) J.T.Pereira

References

External links

Gardenieae
Rubiaceae genera
Flora of Indo-China
Flora of Malesia